Neptis sextilla is a butterfly in the family Nymphalidae.

Taxonomy
The type location is Madagascar, but this is possibly a false locality.  The type is possibly lost and the description suggests that although it may well have been recorded from Madagascar, it is either an aberration or a hybrid between Neptis kikideli and Neptis saclava. It may also be a re-description of one of the agatha species group species from the African mainland.

References

Butterflies described in 1882
sextilla
Butterflies of Africa
Taxa named by Paul Mabille